Algernon William Fulke Greville, 2nd Baron Greville (11 February 1841 – 2 December 1909), styled Hon. Algernon Greville-Nugent from 1866 to 1883, was a British politician.

Early life
Algernon was the eldest of five sons of Fulke Greville-Nugent, 1st Baron Greville and his wife Lady Rosa Nugent. His brothers were Hon. George Greville-Nugent MP (who married Cecil Aitcheson Hankey, a daughter of Lt Gen Henry Aitchison Hankey), Hon. Robert Southwell Greville-Nugent (who died unmarried), Capt. Hon. Reginald Greville-Nugent (who married Louisa Maud Buller-Yarde-Buller, sister of John Yarde-Buller, 1st Baron Churston and daughter of Sir Francis Buller-Yarde-Buller, 2nd Baronet), and Hon. Patrick Greville-Nugent, of Clonyn Castle, the High Sheriff of Westmeath (who married Ermengarde Ogilvy. His sister was Hon Mildred Charlotte Greville-Nugent, who married Alexis Huchet, Marquis de la Bedoyére.

His mother was the only daughter and heir of George Nugent, 1st Marquess of Westmeath and, his first wife, Lady Emily Cecil (second daughter of James Cecil, 1st Marquess of Salisbury). His paternal grandparents were Algernon Greville, of North Lodge in Hertford and the former Caroline Graham (daughter of Sir Bellingham Graham, 6th Baronet).

Career
In 1859, he purchased a commission as cornet and sub-lieutenant in the 1st Regiment of Life Guards, rising to the rank of captain before he retired in 1868.

He entered the House of Commons as a Liberal in 1865 for Westmeath, which he represented until 1874. He was appointed a Groom in Waiting to Queen Victoria in 1869, resigning in 1873. From 1873 to 1874, he was a Lord of the Treasury in Gladstone's government.

Greville barony
He and his father adopted the surname of Greville-Nugent in 1866. On 15 December 1869, his father was created Baron Greville, of Clonyn in the County of Westmeath. Greville-Nugent succeeded to his father's barony in 1883 and resumed the use of the surname of Greville alone.

Personal life
On 16 December 1863, Greville married the writer Lady Beatrice Violet Graham. Her parents were the politician James Graham, 4th Duke of Montrose and the racehorse owner, former Hon. Caroline Agnes Horsley-Beresford (third daughter of John Horsley-Beresford, 2nd Baron Decies). Together, they were the parents of four children: His wife had a fifth child with William Henry John North. North was the 11th baron North, he had his own land and he was the Master of Foxhounds at Wroxton Abbey. He and Violet separated and his wife continued her relationship with North for the rest of her life. Greville refused to divorce her. Their four children were:

 Hon. Ronald Henry Fulke Greville (1864–1908), who married Margaret Helen Anderson, only daughter and heiress of William McEwan MP.
 Charles Beresford Fulke Greville, 3rd Baron Greville (1871–1952), who married American heiress Olive Grace Kerr.
 Hon. Camilla Dagmar Violet Greville (1866–1938), who married Hon. Alistair George Hay, son of the Earl of Kinnoull, on 21 January 1890. They divorced in 1908.
 Hon. Lilian Veronique Greville (1869–1956), who married Cmdr. Herbert Victor Creer in 1907.

His eldest son, Ronald, died without issue in 1908, so he was succeeded by his second son Charles upon his own death in 1909.

References

External links 
 

1841 births
1909 deaths
Barons in the Peerage of the United Kingdom
British Life Guards officers
Greville-Nugent, Algernon
Greville-Nugent, Algernon
Greville-Nugent, Algernon
Greville-Nugent, Algernon
UK MPs who inherited peerages
Algernon
Eldest sons of British hereditary barons